Bangalaia ocellata is a species of beetle in the family Cerambycidae. It was described by Lameere in 1893, originally under the genus Anybostetha. It is known from the Democratic Republic of the Congo, Cameroon, and the Ivory Coast.

References

Prosopocerini
Beetles described in 1893